Cláudio Vinícius dos Santos Britto (born March 11, 1976 in Porto Alegre), known as Cláudio Britto, is a Brazilian footballer who plays as midfielder.

Career statistics

References

External links

1976 births
Living people
Brazilian footballers
Association football midfielders
Campeonato Brasileiro Série C players
União Agrícola Barbarense Futebol Clube players
Esporte Clube Santo André players
Footballers from Porto Alegre